Kerstin Spielberger (born 14 December 1995) is a German ice hockey player for ESC Planegg and the German national team.

She participated at the 2015 IIHF Women's World Championship.

International career
Spielberger was selected for the Germany women's national ice hockey team in the 2014 Winter Olympics. She played in all five games, scoring one goal.

Spielberger also played for Germany in the qualifying event for the 2014 Winter Olympics

As of 2014, Spielberger has also appeared for Germany at two IIHF Women's World Championships, with the first in 2012.

Spielberger made three appearances for the Germany women's national under-18 ice hockey team, at the IIHF World Women's U18 Championships, with the first in 2011.

Career statistics
Through 2013–14 season

References

External links

1995 births
Living people
Olympic ice hockey players of Germany
Ice hockey players at the 2014 Winter Olympics
German women's ice hockey forwards
People from Burghausen, Altötting
Sportspeople from Upper Bavaria